Khansari (related to Khvansar or Khvansar County in Isfahan Province, Iran) is a Persian language surname which is also common among the Iranian diaspora. Notable people with the surname include:

 Adib Khansari (1901–1982), Iranian musician
 Ahmad Khansari (1891–1951), Iranian cleric
 Mohammad Hadi Ghazanfari Khansari (born 1957), Iranian Twelver Shi'a cleric
 Omid Khansari (born 1979), Swedish actor
 Yadollah Kaboli Khansari (born 1949), Iranian calligrapher
 Seyed Ali Kashefi Khansari (born 1972), Iranian writer

See also 
 Khonsari, another transcription of the same Iranian surname

References 

Persian-language surnames